Walter Darío Ribonetto (born 9 July 1974, in Corral de Bustos, Córdoba) is a former Argentine football defender.

Career

Ribonetto did not make his professional debut until the age of 27, until then he had only played amateur football in the Corral de Bustos local leagues. He made his professional debut for Lanús in 2001, playing for the club until 2003, he then joined Querétaro F.C. in Mexico.

After playing in Mexico, Ribonetto joined Junior in Colombia and then Olimpia in Paraguay before returning to Argentina in 2006 to resume his career at Lanús. In 2007, he was part of the squad that won the 2007 Apertura tournament, Lanús' first ever top flight league title.

During the 2009–10 season, Ribonetto gained promotion to the Argentine Primera with Quilmes. For the following season, he joined regionalized third division side Talleres de Córdoba.

Honours

References

External links
 Argentine Primera statistics
 ESPN statistics
 Article about making his debut at the age of 27

1974 births
Living people
Sportspeople from Córdoba Province, Argentina
Argentine footballers
Association football defenders
Argentine Primera División players
Liga MX players
Club Atlético Lanús footballers
Atlético Junior footballers
Club Olimpia footballers
Rosario Central footballers
Quilmes Atlético Club footballers
Talleres de Córdoba footballers
Querétaro F.C. footballers
Argentine expatriate footballers
Expatriate footballers in Colombia
Expatriate footballers in Mexico
Expatriate footballers in Paraguay